The  ("Royal March") is the national anthem of Spain. It is one of only four national anthems in the world – along with those of Bosnia and Herzegovina, San Marino and Kosovo – that have no official lyrics. Although it had lyrics in the past, they are no longer used.

One of the oldest in the world, the Spanish national anthem was first printed in a document dated 1761 and entitled  (Book of the Ordinance of Newly Played Military Fife and Drum Calls by The Spanish Infantry), by Manuel de Espinosa. There, it is entitled . According to the document, Manuel de Espinosa de los Monteros is the composer.

There is a misconception that its author was Frederick II of Prussia, a great lover of music. That mistaken belief arose in 1861 when it was published as fact in the periodical  (Military Spain). According to Vallecillo, the anthem was a gift from Frederick II to the Count of Colomera, who was serving in the Prussian Court to learn the military tactics developed by Frederick II's army, under orders of King Charles III.

In 1770, Charles III declared the  the official Honor March, an act that formalized the tradition of playing it in public, especially on solemn occasions. It became the official Spanish anthem during Isabel II's reign.

In 1870, after the 1868 Revolution, General Juan Prim organized a national contest to create a new official state anthem, and a jury consisting of three well-known composers was chosen to designate a winning entry. Although over 400 compositions were submitted, including those written by the young composers Federico Chueca, Ruperto Chapí and Tomás Bretón, a new anthem was never selected. After extensive deliberations, the jury had advised that  was already considered the country's official anthem, and the contest was suspended. By Alfonso XIII's time, the Royal Circular Order of 27 August 1908 established the musical score orchestrated by Bartolomé Pérez Casas, Superior musician of the Royal Corps of Halberdier Guards, as the official version; it is known traditionally as the Grenadier March or the Royal Spanish March.

According to the Royal Decree 1560/1997, it should be in the key of B-flat major and a tempo of 76 bpm (♩=76), with a form of AABB and a duration of 52 seconds.

Current version
Tempo is set to ♩= 76 and key to B-flat.

The long, complete version is the honors music for the King, while a shorter version without the repetitions is performed for the Princess of Asturias, the President of the Government of Spain, or during sporting events.

There are also three official arrangements: one for orchestra, another for military band, and a third for organ, written by Francisco Grau Vegara and requested by the Government of Spain. All in all, there are six different official adaptations, for each arrangement and length. They all were recorded by the Spanish National Orchestra and the Spanish Royal Guard Band as an official recording and released on compact disc for a limited period of time.

Copyright issues
The government bought it from Pérez Casas' estate in 1997 for 130 million pesetas (781,315.734 euros) to avoid future legal problems. Until it expires, the copyright belongs to the Ministry of Culture and collecting societies charge copyright fees, which has led to criticism.

As a result, many different harmonisations have been devised by performers to avoid paying. Nonetheless, the rights to the 1997 Francisco Grau revision were transferred to the government at no charge, but they were not placed in the public domain.

Music

Lyrics
Though the  has no official lyrics, words have been written and used for it in the past. One version was used during Alfonso XIII's reign and another during the Francoist State; however, none of them were ever made official. The national anthem has been played without words since 1978, when lyrics that had been approved by General Franco were abandoned. Occasionally the Francoist lyrics have been erroneously performed after their abandonment.

Lyrics competition
After witnessing a rendition of You'll Never Walk Alone at Anfield in 2007, the President of the Spanish Olympic Committee (COE), Alejandro Blanco, said he felt inspired to seek lyrics to  ahead of Madrid's bid to host the 2016 Olympic Games. That same year Telecinco, enticed by the COE, organized a national contest and posted 25 different lyrics on their website which they thought best matched COE's requirements. The winner was chosen, although only 40,000 people voted. The lyrics by Enrique Hernández-Luike, magazine publisher and poet, spoke of freedom, peace and the Constitution. The winning lyrics were sung by the Ronda de Aranzueque choir in Pastrana, and filmed by German television. However, the COE organized a new competition for the lyrics, which resulted in between 2,000 and 7,000 entries (depending on source). A private team of jurors chose the entry by Paulino Cubero, then unemployed. The new lyrics received criticism, resulting in them being pulled only five days later, and the idea was scrapped indefinitely.

A number of the autonomous communities of Spain have their own regional anthems.

Former lyrics

Lyrics during Alfonso XIII's reign
Lyrics by Eduardo Marquina (1879–1946)
La bandera de España (Coro)
Gloria, gloria, corona de la Patria,
soberana luz
que es oro en tu Pendón.
Vida, vida, futuro de la Patria,
que en tus ojos es
abierto corazón...!
Púrpura y oro: bandera inmortal;
en tus colores, juntas, carne y alma están.
Púrpura y oro: querer y lograr;
Tú eres, bandera, el signo del humano afán.

España guiadora (Solo)
¡Pide, España! ¡Tu nombre llevaremos
donde quieras tú;
que honrarlo es nuestra ley!
¡Manda, España, y unidos lucharemos,
porque vivas tú,
sin tregua pueblo y rey!
Una bandera gloriosa nos das;
¡nadie, viviendo, España, nos la arrancará!
Para que, un día, nos pueda cubrir,
¡danos, España, el gozo de morir por ti!

¡Viva España!... (Coro)
¡Viva España! Del grito de la Patria,
la explosión triunfal
abrió camino al sol;
¡Viva España! repiten veinte pueblos
y al hablar dan fe
del ánimo español...
¡Marquen arado martillo y clarín
su noble ritmo al grito de la Patria fe!
¡Guíe la mente a la mano hasta el fin,
al "Viva España" asista toda España en pie!
Flag of Spain (Chorus)
Glory, glory, crown of the Fatherland
sovereign light
which in your standard is gold.
Life, life, future of the Fatherland,
in your eyes it is
an open heart
Purple and gold: immortal flag;
in your colors, together, flesh and soul are.
Purple and gold: to want and to achieve;
You are, flag, the sign of human effort.

Spain guiding (Solo)
Ask of us, Spain! Your name we will take
anywhere you want;
because honoring it is our law!
Command us, Spain, and united we will fight,
so that you may live,
relentless people and king!
You give us a glorious flag;
Nobody, who is alive, Spain, will take it from us!
So that, one day, we can be covered by it,
Give us, Spain, the joy of dying for you!

Long live Spain! ... (Chorus)
Long live Spain! The cry of the Fatherland,
the triumphant explosion
Has opened the way to the sun;
Long live Spain! repeated twenty peoples
and when they speak they have faith
in the Spanish will ...
Mark plow hammer and bugle
your noble rhythm at the cry of the Fatherland faith!
Guide the mind and the hand until the end,
the "Long Live Spain" Spain attends all standing!

Franco-era lyrics
Lyrics were adapted from an earlier version on 1928 written by José María Pemán (1897–1981) during the reign of Alfonso XIII and the government of Miguel Primo de Rivera. The changes intended to fit the symbols of the extreme right-wing ideology of General Francisco Franco, referred to as National-Catholicism, which were the "salute with the extended right arm" and the "yoke and arrows". The yoke and arrows were, firstly, a symbol used in the Middle Ages by Isabella of Castile and Ferdinand of Aragon to represent the union of their dynasties and their kingdoms, and secondly, the symbol of Falangism in Spain.

Interpretation and etiquette

Military bands of the Spanish Armed Forces and the National Police Corps of Spain and civilian Marching bands and Concert bands play the B flat-major version of the anthem adapted for wind bands (as arranged by Francisco Grau), and playing the A major version is optional.

The bugle call To the Colors in Spain is the version played by Bugle bands in Spanish churches in religious occasions and processions organized by civil groups and the parishes. Various versions adapted for the drum and the bugle are used, even though brass instruments play the anthem as well. But in some bugle bands, the A flat version of the anthem (the old official one, adapted for the bugle) is played. Only a bugle call is sounded when the B flat version is played.

Being the national anthem, and played in honor of the King and the Queen of Spain, it is common for all to stand once it is played. Even though it is also played in church events, respect for the royal family is required by everyone in attendance; civilians stand at attention, and those in uniform salute when not in formation.

See also
 Anthems of the autonomous communities of Spain

References

External links
 
 The National Anthem (Prime Minister's Office site)
 Streaming audio, lyrics and information about the 
 2008 Spanish National Anthem Lyrics in English and in Spanish
 MIDI File
 MP3 version by Band of 
 UNANU – The  has a website about the anthem, with a complete instrumental version. Archived from the original on 22 October 2004.
 English translation of the proposed new lyrics

Royal anthems
Spanish anthems
National symbols of Spain
National anthem compositions in C major